Giovanni Battista Maderni (1758 -1803) was an Italian-Swiss painter.

Biography
He was born in Verona to Pietro Maderni, a sculptor native to Codilago in the Ticino. Giovanni Battista studied in the Academy of Fine Arts of Florence. Returning to Verona, he painted a canvas of Fall of the Jews in Mantua for a local church. He traveled to Paris, Berlin, London, Netherlands. He made a set of engravings on describing the art and architecture of the Teatro Tordinona in Rome. He then moved to St Petersburg, and finally to Stockholm.

References

1758 births
1803 deaths
People from Ticino
18th-century Italian painters
Italian male painters
19th-century Italian painters
18th-century Swiss painters
18th-century Swiss male artists
19th-century Swiss painters
19th-century Italian male artists
Painters from Verona
Accademia di Belle Arti di Firenze alumni
18th-century Italian male artists